The 2019–20 Chennaiyin FC season was the club's sixth season since its establishment in 2014 and their sixth season in the Indian Super League.

Players

Technical staff

Transfers

Transfers in

Transfers out

Competitions

Chennaiyin travelled to the TransStadia in Ahmedabad and JRD Tata Sports Complex in Jamshedpur for their pre-season tour ahead of the new season.

There, the club was set to play friendlies with Ahmedabad's ARA club on September 15 whereas they will start Ahmedabad campaign on September 1.

On September 20, Chennaiyin will travel to Jamshedpur. Its opponents and dates for preseason friendlies in Jamshedpur will be confirmed later.

Chennaiyin FC, Gokulam Kerala FC play out draw in pre-season friendly on October 8.

Indian Super League

Standings

League Results by round

Matchday

Squad appearances and goals

|-
! colspan=10 style=background:#dcdcdc; text-align:center| Goalkeepers

|-
! colspan=10 style=background:#dcdcdc; text-align:center| Defenders

 
|-
! colspan=10 style=background:#dcdcdc; text-align:center| Midfielders

|-
! colspan=10 style=background:#dcdcdc; text-align:center| Forwards

|}

Squad statistics

Goalscorers

Clean sheets

Disciplinary record

References

Chennaiyin FC seasons
Chennaiyin